Jesse James Palmer (born October 5, 1978) is a Canadian television personality, sports commentator, actor, and former professional football player who was a quarterback in the National Football League (NFL) for five seasons in the early 2000s.  Palmer played college football for the University of Florida, and thereafter, he played professionally for the New York Giants and San Francisco 49ers in the NFL before spending half of the 2006 season with the Montreal Alouettes of the Canadian Football League (CFL).  Palmer was cast in 2004 as the bachelor on the fifth season of the reality television series The Bachelor. He went on to become a college football analyst for ESPN/ABC in the United States, and has been a contributor to The Sports Network (TSN) in Canada.  He was also a contributor to ABC's Good Morning America. In 2018, he hosted the kickoff season of The Proposal on ABC.  Since 2017 he has hosted the Holiday Baking Championship on Food Network. Jesse was host of DailyMailTV from 2017 to 2020. Palmer married model Emely Fardo on June 5, 2020, at a close friend's house in Connecticut. In 2021, Palmer was named as the permanent host of The Bachelor and The Bachelorette.

Early years
Palmer was born in Toronto, Ontario, and raised in Nepean, Ontario, a suburb of Ottawa. He attended both Confederation and St. Pius X high schools, although he played all of his amateur football on teams in the Ontario Minor Football Association and most importantly with the Ottawa Norsemen and Myers Riders Football Clubs in Ottawa.

His father, Bill Palmer, played for the Ottawa Rough Riders. His mother, Susan, was a prominent fashion and print model, co-founder of Barrett Palmer Models and former owner of the original ITM: International Top Models, a modeling agency and training centre located in Ottawa; eventually became the current agency MIM Model International Management.

College career
Palmer accepted an athletic scholarship to attend the University of Florida in Gainesville, Florida, where he played for coach Steve Spurrier's Florida Gators football team from 1997 to 2000.

Palmer often alternated playing time with quarterback Doug Johnson, and, later, with quarterback Rex Grossman. As a senior, he was selected as one of the team captains and received the Gators' Fergie Ferguson Award, recognizing the "senior football player who displays outstanding leadership, character and courage." He finished his four-year college career with 3,755 passing yards.

Palmer graduated from the University of Florida in 2001 with two undergraduate degrees: a Bachelor of Arts degree in political science from the College of Liberal Arts and Sciences, and a Bachelor of Science degree in marketing from the College of Business Administration.

Professional football career

National Football League

As a Giants quarterback, he spent most of his NFL career as a backup behind starter Kerry Collins. In 2002, Palmer played in two games. The following season, Palmer played in six games, starting three. In 2003, he was sacked by Washington Redskins defensive end Bruce Smith, Smith's 199th career sack, which enabled him to become the all-time career sack leader.

After a four-year stint as a backup quarterback, he was cut on September 3, 2005, by the Giants. Palmer was the second Canadian (after Mark Rypien of the Washington Redskins) to start at quarterback in the NFL.

Canadian Football League
Palmer was drafted by the Montreal Alouettes of the Canadian Football League (CFL) 15th overall in 2001 CFL Draft. At first, wanting to stay in the game, he looked to the Canadian Football League for employment. His rights were held by Montreal; however, the Ottawa Renegades tried to acquire the Ottawa native as their top quarterback in September 2005, and Palmer expressed interest in playing for his home town.

Attempting to locate another opportunity to stay in the NFL, Palmer worked out with the Minnesota Vikings and Oakland Raiders and was signed by the San Francisco 49ers on November 1, 2005, as injuries plagued their quarterbacks Alex Smith and Ken Dorsey. Dorsey and Smith returned from injury three weeks later, and Palmer was released without having played a down. Palmer was re-signed by the 49ers in March 2006 during the off-season but was later released on August 29, 2006, toward the end of training camp. On September 11, 2006, the Montreal Alouettes signed him to their developmental roster. Palmer did not dress for a game with Montreal. He retired from the CFL before the start of the 2007 season to pursue a broadcasting career.

The Bachelor

In 2004, Palmer was the first professional athlete to appear on The Bachelor television program and the first non-American Bachelor. During the first rose ceremony, Palmer called the name Katie in error, meaning to say Karen. After consulting with host Chris Harrison, Palmer offered a rose to both contestants. He eventually selected Jessica Bowlin, but their courtship lasted for only a few months after the end of the show. He would return as host of the 26th season, a role which he will also fill on the 19th season of The Bachelorette. Palmer also hosted Bachelor In Paradise, Season 8. He is currently host of The Bachelor franchises.

Broadcasting career
Palmer was a color commentator for Fox for two games late in the 2005 season, and returned to the booth on November 26, 2006. On April 25, 2007, Palmer appeared on the NFL Network as an analyst and commentator for the weekend's NFL Draft.

On May 24, 2007, Palmer announced his retirement from the Canadian Football League to pursue a broadcasting career with Fox. He joined ESPN in 2007. Palmer worked for ESPN as a studio analyst on College Football Live and ABC telecasts, and frequently appeared with fellow Canadian John Saunders until 2017. He is a game analyst on ESPN Thursday Night College football games. He was also co-host on The Palmer and Pollack Show on ESPNU with former Georgia defensive end, David Pollack.

On March 12, 2014, ESPN named Palmer and Brent Musburger as the lead game announcers for the forthcoming SEC Network.

Palmer was also New York correspondent for CTV's entertainment news program, eTalk, covering both sports and entertainment events, including the Super Bowl and the 79th and 80th Academy Awards.

Palmer was a studio analyst for ESPN's broadcast of the 2012 Cotton Bowl in Dallas, Texas, the 2010 Fiesta Bowl in Glendale, Arizona, and the 2009 Rose Bowl in Pasadena, California. he is also an NFL analyst for TSN's "Monday Morning Quarterback" segment.

Palmer guest starred in the Law & Order: Special Victims Unit season 7 episode "Design," portraying professional baseball player Don Lacey. He hosted the first two seasons of the food competition show Recipe to Riches on Food Network Canada. On May 19, 2015, Palmer joined Good Morning America as a "Special Contributor". He left the position in August 2017, to host the newly launched DailyMailTV. He has also hosted Spring Baking Championship and Holiday Baking Championship on Food Network, as well as Food Truck Face Off, Bakeaway Camp, and Holiday Baking: Gingerbread Showdown. In 2019 he became one of the commentators on ESPN’s College Football Final.

In September 2018, Palmer began doing commercials as a spokesman for retail furniture chain Rooms To Go. He also became host of The Proposal on ABC.

On August 14, 2020, the producers of DailyMailTV announced that Palmer was being replaced as host for the show's fourth season by Thomas Roberts.

In 2021, Palmer hosted the inaugural season of ABC's show The Ultimate Surfer. Subsequently it was announced that he would become the new host of The Bachelor, Season 26, replacing Chris Harrison. He then hosted The Bachelorette, Season 19, and Bachelor In Paradise, Season 8. He is currently host of The Bachelor franchises.

See also

 Florida Gators football, 1990–99
 List of Florida Gators in the NFL Draft
 List of New York Giants players
 List of University of Florida alumni

References

External links 
  Jesse Palmer – Florida Gators player profile
 

1978 births
Living people
Bachelor Nation contestants
Canadian expatriate sportspeople in the United States
Canadian football quarterbacks
Canadian infotainers
Canadian players of American football
Canadian television hosts
College football announcers
ESPN people
Florida Gators football players
Montreal Alouettes players
National Football League announcers
New York Giants players
Players of Canadian football from Ontario
San Francisco 49ers players
Sportspeople from Hoboken, New Jersey
Canadian football people from Ottawa
Canadian football people from Toronto
Warrington College of Business alumni